Cecilia Robinson (born 1985), originally from Sweden, is a New Zealand entrepreneur and founder of the My Food Bag business.

Biography 
Robinson grew up in Sweden and moved to the United States to work as a nanny before making a trip to New Zealand to visit her brother, who was living there. She stayed and enrolled to study law at the University of Auckland, but dropped out to start an online nanny website, Au Pair Link. The business quickly grew to be the biggest au pair company in Australasia. Robinson sold the company in 2014.

In late 2012, Robinson and her husband James established My Food Bag with former Telecom CEO Theresa Gattung, celebrity chef Nadia Lim, and Lim's husband Carlos Bagrie. The business was launched in March 2013. The founding team sold 70% of the company to Waterman Capital in 2016 and appointed new CEO Kevin Bowler mid 2018. Robinson continued with the business as a director.

Recognition and awards 
In 2013, Robinson won the EY Young Entrepreneur of the Year Award. In 2014, Robinson was named NEXT Woman of the Year in the Business category. In 2017 she won the Business Enterprise Award and the Supreme Award at the New Zealand Women of Influence Awards.

References

Living people
Swedish emigrants to New Zealand
New Zealand Women of Influence Award recipients
21st-century New Zealand businesspeople
1985 births